Dmitri Dmitriyevich Rybchinsky (born 19 August 1998) is a Russian professional footballer who plays for Pari NN on loan from Lokomotiv Moscow. He is deployed in multiple positions, as wide midfielder (both right and left) and as a right back.

Club career
He made his debut in the Russian Professional Football League for FC Lokomotiv-Kazanka Moscow on 19 July 2017 in a game against FC Znamya Truda Orekhovo-Zuyevo.

He made his debut in the Russian Premier League for FC Lokomotiv Moscow on 15 July 2019 in a game against FC Rubin Kazan, as an 82nd-minute substitute for Rifat Zhemaletdinov.

On 16 June 2022, Rybchinsky was loaned to Pari NN for the 2022–23 season.

Honours

Club
Lokomotiv Moscow
 Russian Cup: 2020–21

Career statistics

References

External links
 
 
 Profile by Russian Professional Football League

1998 births
Footballers from Moscow
Living people
Russian footballers
Russia youth international footballers
Russia under-21 international footballers
Association football midfielders
Association football defenders
FC Lokomotiv Moscow players
FC Nizhny Novgorod (2015) players
Russian Premier League players
Russian Second League players